18th Reconnaissance Squadron may refer to:
 The 18th Attack Squadron, designated the 18th Reconnaissance Squadron from April 2006 to May 2016.
 The 908th Air Refueling Squadron, designated the 18th Reconnaissance Squadron, 18th Reconnaissance Squadron (Medium Range), and 18th Reconnaissance Squadron (Medium) from September 1936 to April 1942. 
 The 18th Reconnaissance Squadron (Bombardment) active from April 1943 to August 1943. 
 The 918th Air Refueling Squadron, designated the 18th Reconnaissance Squadron, Photographic from November 1947 to June 1949.

See also
 The 18th Tactical Reconnaissance Squadron